The Ship is a pub at 27 Lime Street, London EC3.

It is a Grade II listed building, built in the mid-19th century.

References

External links
 

Grade II listed pubs in the City of London